In data science, sameAs or exactMatch is a method of indicating that the subject of, or entity represented by, two resources is considered to be one and the same thing. It is a key part of the Semantic Web.

Uses 

The concept of sameAs exists in a number of different schemas and systems:

 JSON-LD
 OWL - owl:sameAs
 schema.org
 SKOS - skos:exactMatch
 Wikidata - Property:P2888 "exact match", with the alias "sameas"

The owl:sameAs predicate has been described as "an essential ingredient of the Semantic Web architecture".

Recognition 

Google recognises sameAs relationships expressed via schema.org or JSON-LD, used by individuals or organisations, and uses them to populate the Google Knowledge panel in search results.

References

External links 

 sameAs.cc
 sameas.org
 `owl:sameAs` specification: https://www.w3.org/TR/owl-ref/#sameAs-def 

Semantic Web